Dvaita Vedanta; (originally known as Tattvavada; IAST: Tattvavāda), is a sub-school in the Vedanta tradition of Hindu philosophy. The term Tattvavada literally means "arguments from a realist viewpoint". The Tattvavada (Dvaita) Vedanta sub-school was founded by the 13th-century Indian philosopher-saint Madhvacharya. Madhvacharya believed in three entities: God, jiva (soul), and jada (maya, matter). The Dvaita Vedanta school believes that God and the individual souls (jīvātman) exist as independent realities, and these are distinct, being said that Vishnu (Narayana) is independent (svatantra), and souls are dependent (paratantra) on him.

The Dvaita school contrasts with the other two major sub-schools of Vedanta, the Advaita Vedanta of Adi Shankara which posits nondualism—that ultimate reality (Brahman) and human soul (Ātman) are identical and all reality is interconnected oneness, and Vishishtadvaita of Ramanuja which posits qualified nondualism—that ultimate reality (Brahman) and human soul are different but with the potential to be identical. Sanyasi's of the Dvaita Vedanta tradition belong to the ēkadaṇḍi order.

Etymology
Dvaita (द्वैत) is a Sanskrit word that means "duality, dualism". The term refers to any premise, particularly in theology on the material and the divine, where two principles (truths) or realities are posited to exist simultaneously and independently. Indologist B. N. Krishnamurti Sharma says: "The English term Dualism is inadequate to express the full content and depth of meaning that Madhva has put into the term Dvaita, as it is to be implied to his system. Even the Sanskrit word Dvaita is not literally capable of expressing more than the fundamental principles accepted.  B. N. K. Sharma suggested to use the term Svatantra-Advitiya-Brahmavāda as an alternative name to Madhva's system. Sharma says, Satyadhyana Tirtha of Uttaradi Math approved this. B. N. K. Sharma further states that "the term Svatantra-Advitiya-Brahmavāda is capable of conveying directly rather than by implication or definition, the highest reach of its thought and its metaphysical ideology do often stressed by Madhva and so well expounded by Jayatirtha". It may be seen that such a term would do justice to both the aspects of reality—the finite and the infinite".

Quoting the term Advitīyatva, Sharma also states that "the term Advitīyatva has been interpreted by Madhva, in the Chandogya Bhashya, in terms of "absence of peer and superior" to Brahman, conceding by implication, the existence, the reality of "lesser reals" like matter and souls under the aegis of God. The first part of the text has been taken to emphasize the unity of God-head by excluding internal distinctions of substance and attributes in Brahman in conformity with text like नेह नानास्ति किंचना, which are understood as nagating some internal distinctions (nānātva) alone in Brahman. The only internal distinctions that are logically conceivable in Brahman, are those of attributes. This is negated by the way of significant negation. The adjunct Svatantra would thus serve to emphasize the transcendence of the supreme over the other reals and its immanence in them and show how the conception of Brahman, here, differs from the Nirviśeṣādvaita of Adi Shankara. Quoting the term Svatantra-Advitiya-Brahmavāda, Sharma also says: "It would also stand terminologically balanced with the distinctions of other Vēdantic systems like Nirviśeṣādvaita, śuddhādvaita, and Viśiṣṭādvaita. It would also lay direct emphasis on the primacy of the supreme as the Para-Siddhanta of the Madhva's thought, and put the teachings about the finite in their proper place as constituting the Apara-Siddhānta (subsidiary truths)".

Aluru Venkata Rao opines that the term Dvaita is not suitable for Madhva's philosophy, hence it should not be used. Instead, he suggests to use the term Pūrnabrahmavāda.

Philosophy 

Dvaita Vedanta is a dualistic interpretation of the Vedas systematized by the 13th-century Indian philosopher-saint Madhvacharya, which espouses dualism by theorizing the existence of two separate realities. The first and the only independent reality (svatantra-tattva), states the Dvaita school, is that of Vishnu as the ultimate reality (Brahman) and supreme God. Vishnu is the supreme Self, in a manner similar to the monotheistic God in other major religions. He is believed to be almighty, eternal, always existing, everlasting, all-knowing, and compassionate. The second reality is that of dependent (asvatantra-tattva or paratantra) but equally real universe that exists with its own separate essence. Everything that is composed of the second reality, such as individual soul, matter, and the like exist with their own separate reality. The distinguishing factor of this philosophy, as opposed to monistic Advaita Vedanta, is that God takes on a personal role and is seen as a real eternal entity that governs and controls the universe.

Like Ramanuja, Madhvacharya also embraced Vaishnavism. Madhvacharya posits God as being personal and saguna, that is endowed with attributes and qualities (in human terms, which are not believed to be able to fully describe God). To Madhvacharya, the metaphysical concept of Brahman in the Vedas was Vishnu. He stated: "Brahmaśabdaśca Viṣṇaveva", that Brahman can only refer to Vishnu. Scriptures which say different are declared as non-authoritative by him. To him, Vishnu was not just any other deva, but rather the one and only Supreme Being. According to him, the devas are souls of deceased persons who were rewarded for good deeds by being reincarnated into the heavenly worlds and becoming following organs of God's will, which would also be the case with Vayu and Lakshmi. He also believes that they are mortal, and that some of them could sink into lower stages of existence after death. Therefore, he believes that only God shall be worshipped through them, and that worshipping them on their own behalf is an apostasy which emerged during Treta Yuga, and did not yet exist during Satya Yuga. According to him, this must also be noticed regarding murtis.

Dvaita Vedanta acknowledges two principles; however, it holds one of them (the sentient) as being eternally dependent on the other. The individual souls (jiva) are depicted as reflections, images or shadows of the divine, but never in any way (even after moksha, or liberation) identical with the divine. Being a reflection of God, each jiva has a nature with some characteristics (truth, conscious, bliss) of God in varying degree which is under the influence of karma in bondage and expands to its distinct full intrinsic capacity in moksha. Liberated jivas do not attain equality with Brahman and also are not equal to each other.

Moksha (liberation) therefore is described as the realization that all finite reality is essentially dependent on the Supreme. God is believed to have shown the way to attain moksha through several avatars. Bhakti Yoga is an essential part of Dvaita Vedanta. By devotion to God and God's grace, jiva attains moksha. However, bad karma results in condemnation from God.

Five fundamental, eternal and real differences are described in Dvaita school:
 Between the individual souls (or jīvātman) and God (paramathma or Vishnu).
 Between matter (inanimate, insentient) and God.
 Between individual souls (jīvātman).
 Between matter and jīvātman.
 Between various types of matter.

The theory of five differences is that "the jiva is different from every other entity including all jivas". These five differences are said to explain the nature of the universe. The world is called prapañca (pañca "five") by the Dvaita school for this reason.

Madhva differed significantly from traditional Hindu beliefs owing to his concept of eternal damnation. According to him, there are three different classes of souls: One class, Mukti-yogyas, which would qualify for liberation, another, the Nitya-samsarins, which would be subject to eternal rebirth or eternal transmigration and a third class, Tamo-yogyas, which would be condemned to eternal hell (Andhatamisra).

Sadhana and Liberation 
According to Madhvacharya, jiva is unaware of its real nature due to ignorance (avidyā) caused by maya, and thus, is unable to realize its expression of intrinsic attributes. Liberation for each jiva means realizing its innate bliss by removal of covering of maya. Liberation can only be achieved by the grace of God with self-effort on the part of jiva. Practicing vairāgya allows Mukti-yogyas (jivas qualified for liberation) to gain freedom from worldly attachments and develop faith in God. Self-effort which makes jiva worthy for liberation involves karma (good work), Jnana Yoga (knowledge) and Bhakti Yoga (devotion). Sādhaka performs such sadhana through śravaṇa, manana and nididhyasana. Madhva also placed a great importance on a Guru's guidance and blessings to understand the jnana from scriptures. According to Madhva, śravaṇa and manana are the only means for nidhiyasana. This sadhana leads the sadhaka to aparoksa-jnana (spiritual realisation) and liberation through grace of God.

Influence 
 Dvaita Vedanta and Madhvacharya's historical influence in Hinduism, state Kulandran and Kraemer, has been salutary, but not extensive.
 According to Sharma, the influence of Dvaita Vedanta ideas have been most prominent on the Chaitanya school of Bengal Vaishnavism, and in Assam.
 Madhva's theology influenced later scholars such as Nimbarka, Vallabha and Chaitanya Mahaprabhu. B.N.K. Sharma notes that Nimbarka's theology is a loose réchauffé of Madhva's in its most essential aspects.

See also
 Madhvacharya
 Madhwa Brahmins
 Dvaita literature
 Madhavendra Puri
 Gaudiya Vaishnavism / Achintya Bheda Abheda
 Brahma-Madhva-Gaudiya Sampradaya

References

Bibliography

External links
 Tatvavada

Dualism in cosmology
Dvaita Vedanta
Vedanta
Schools and traditions in ancient Indian philosophy
Hindu mythology